Burt Ward (born Bert John Gervis Jr. ; July 6, 1945) is an American actor, animal welfare activist and businessman. He played Dick Grayson's Robin, the sidekick of Batman (played by Adam West), in the television series Batman (1966–1968), its theatrical feature film, the Saturday morning animated series The New Adventures of Batman (1977), the two-episode pilot Legends of the Superheroes (1979), the animated reunion films Batman: Return of the Caped Crusaders (2016) and Batman vs. Two-Face (2017), and the live-action television event Crisis on Infinite Earths (2019).

Early life
Ward was born Bert John Gervis Jr., on July 6, 1945, in Los Angeles, California. His father, Bert Sr., was the owner of a traveling ice show called "Rhapsody On Ice". At age two, Ward was listed in the magazine Strange as It Seems as a professional ice skater. Growing up, he was an avid reader of comic books such as Superman and Superboy, and enjoyed the action-adventure show Adventures of Superman. He acquired the nickname "Sparky" in his youth, possibly from the sparks his skates kicked up during his routines or his energetic nature.
He excelled in high school sport activities such as football, track, and wrestling; he was also a member of the chess club and is a practitioner of Taekwondo. After graduation, he enrolled in college while working part-time for his father's real-estate company.

Career
At the age of 19, Ward auditioned for the role of Robin. West and Ward were up against Lyle Waggoner and Peter Deyell for the roles of Batman and Robin, respectively. Selected for the role of Robin, Ward thought people would find Gervis (the "G" is soft, as in "gentleman") hard to pronounce and adopted his mother's maiden name, Ward. He also changed the spelling of Bert to "Burt" to add "punch".

Unlike the series' lead, Adam West, Ward was required to perform some dangerous stunt work. He was told this was because his costume revealed more of his face, making it impractical for all of his stunt scenes to be performed by a stunt double. Later, he also discovered that he was being paid the minimum wage allowed by the Screen Actors Guild, and his stunt double was paid per stunt, so having Ward perform his own stunts was a cost-saving strategy. Ward says that he was sent to the emergency room dozens of times during his time as Robin.

At the height of the series' popularity, Ward recorded several musical tracks during sessions produced by  Tom Wilson and arranged by Frank Zappa. The first two, "Boy Wonder, I Love You" (which Zappa wrote) and "Orange Colored Sky", were released as a single on November 14, 1966. Two other tracks from these sessions, "Teenage Bill of Rights" and "Autumn Love", remain unreleased.

During the first months of shooting, Ward was paid $350 per week. The series only lasted three seasons, for a total of 120 episodes; according to Ward in an interview, this was because of the high cost of production. It was still high in the ratings, but ABC was losing money. Later, NBC offered to pick it up for a fourth season, but the offer was withdrawn after learning that the sets had been destroyed. West and Ward reprised their TV roles of Batman and Robin in the 20th Century Fox film Batman: The Movie released on July 30, 1966.

In 1969, a year after Batman'''s cancellation, West's mother died, bringing the two men closer together. They were reunited many times at conventions and TV reunion specials. In turn, Ward also made three guest appearances with West on separate cartoons: one was a 2002 episode of The Simpsons, later in 2010 on an episode of SpongeBob SquarePants, and in 2013 for one of the final episodes of Futurama. West and Ward remained friends until West's death on June 9, 2017, at age 88.

Ward, Julie Newmar, and Lee Meriwether are the last surviving main cast members of Batman.

Post-Batman career
After the end of Batman, Ward, like Adam West, found himself hard-pressed to find other acting jobs. He did act in more than 40 made-for-television films such as Virgin High.

In 1985, DC Comics named Ward as one of the honorees in the company's 50th-anniversary publication Fifty Who Made DC Great for his work on the Batman series.

In June 1995, Ward wrote a tell-all autobiography called Boy Wonder: My Life in Tights, which described his time playing Robin.

Ward appeared in numerous reunions with co-star Adam West. The most memorable included reprising their roles as the Dynamic Duo on a short-lived animated series called The New Adventures of Batman, as well as The Batman/Tarzan Adventure Hour and Tarzan and the Super 7. In addition, they reappeared as the Dynamic Duo for Legends of the Superheroes. West and Ward finally reunited in the 2003 television movie, Return to the Batcave: The Misadventures of Adam and Burt.

During a Pro Wrestling Unplugged angle with wrestler Johnny Kashmere, Ward "knighted" Kashmere as the "New Batman". Ward has appeared on the show several times, walking out to the theme music from the 1960s Batman.

In 2001, Ward established the now-closed Boy Wonder Visual Effects, Inc.

In 2012, Bluewater comics was planning to issue a four-issue comic miniseries in homage to Burt Ward playing Robin, called Burt Ward, Boy Wonder, but it was apparently canceled. It starred Burt Ward and his crimefighting rescue dogs Gentle and Giant fighting crime. Part of the first issue was released on Free Comic Book Day 2012.

Beginning in late 2017, Ward is seen promoting the Batman television series and other classic television series on the MeTV television network.

In 2016 and 2017 respectively, West and Ward reunited a final time, to reprise the Dynamic Duo in the animated movies Batman: Return of the Caped Crusaders and Batman vs. Two-Face, the latter being released after West's death.

On January 9, 2020, Ward received a star on the Hollywood Walk of Fame.

Charity work
In 1994, Ward and his wife, Tracy Posner Ward, founded a charitable organization called Gentle Giants Rescue and Adoptions, Inc., which rescues giant-breed dogs such as Great Danes and some smaller-breed dogs. Their work with the organization has been featured in such outlets as People magazine, ASPCA Animal Watch, Hard Copy, Inside Edition, and Entertainment Tonight. Ward was also seen in an episode of Animal Planet's Adoption Tales.

Business activity
Burt has also created a company, Gentle Giants, which sells dog and cat food.

Personal life
Ward's first wife was Bonney Lindsey, daughter of conductor Mort Lindsey. Ward and Lindsey married on July 19, 1965, and divorced in 1967. They had one daughter in 1966. From 1967 to 1969, he was  married to actress Kathy Kersh, whom he met when she appeared as a guest villainess on the Batman'' television series. He was married to model Mariana Torchia from 1985 to 1989. Since 1990, Ward has been married to Tracy Posner. Their daughter was born on February 16, 1991.

Filmography

Film

Television

References

External links

 
 
 Gentle Giants Rescue and Adoptions site
 Interview with Burt Ward – The Spectrum, September, 2016

Living people
American male taekwondo practitioners
American male film actors
American stunt performers
American male television actors
American male voice actors
Male actors from Los Angeles
Animal welfare workers
Inkpot Award winners
20th-century American male actors
1945 births